The Disney Development Company was a fully owned subsidiary of the Walt Disney Company, incorporated in Florida. Its primary role had been in the design and construction of certain resort and shopping areas within the Walt Disney World Resort, and the development of the planned community, Celebration, Florida. In May 1996, the Disney Development Company merged with Walt Disney Imagineering to form a single entity.

References 

The Walt Disney Company subsidiaries
1996 disestablishments in Florida